Tom Smith is an American politician serving in the Kentucky House of Representatives since 2021.

Biography 
He was elected in 2020, representing the 86th district.

References 

Living people
Year of birth missing (living people)